The Pittsburgh and Ohio Central Railroad  is a short-line railroad operating  of track over the Chartiers Branch in southwest Pennsylvania. It also operated a small portion of the former Conrail Panhandle Route between Carnegie and Walkers Mill. This portion has not seen a train since 2014, and both bridges on the line have been fenced off. A  section of rail was also cut from the line just west of Carnegie in 2015, rendering the line completely impassible. It is owned by the Ohio Central Railroad System, which is a division of the rail holding company Genesee & Wyoming Inc.

The P&OHC was formed after the purchase by Genesse & Wyoming of the former Pittsburgh Industrial Railroad from RailAmerica, Inc. in 2000.  The line has track extending from its office in the McKees Rocks north to Neville Island and south to Arden in South Strabane Township. Major commodities hauled include chemicals, minerals, plastics, and steel.

Interchanges
McKees Rocks
Pittsburgh, Allegheny & McKees Rocks Railroad (PAM)
CSX
Duff Junction
Norfolk Southern

Roster (as of June 2014)

References

 Western Pennsylvanian Railroads:Pittsburgh & Ohio Central Railroad

External links
Pittsburgh and Ohio Central Railroad official webpage - Genesee and Wyoming website

Pennsylvania railroads
Switching and terminal railroads
Genesee & Wyoming